Roach River may refer to:

 Roach River (Maine)
 Roach River (Virginia)
 River Roach, a river that flows entirely through the English county of Essex

See also
 River Roch, a river in Greater Manchester in North West England